The Romance of Helen Trent was a radio soap opera which aired on CBS from October 30, 1933 to June 24, 1960 for a total of 7,222 episodes. The show was created by Frank and Anne Hummert, who were among the most prolific producers during the radio soap era.

The program opened with:
And now, The Romance of Helen Trent, the real-life drama of Helen Trent, who, when life mocks her, breaks her hopes, dashes her against the rocks of despair, fights back bravely, successfully, to prove what so many women long to prove, that because a woman is 35 or more, romance in life need not be over, that romance can begin at 35.

Characters and story
The storyline revolved around a 35-year-old dressmaker who fascinates men as she works her way up to become the chief Hollywood costumer designer. Helen was played by three different actresses (Virginia Clark, Betty Ruth Smith and Julie Stevens). Virginia Clark did the role for 11 years, and Julie Stevens portrayed Helen for 16 years.

Stevens, who had recently finished playing the title role on the radio soap Kitty Foyle, was only 22 when she joined the cast. She continued in the role from 1944 to the show's cancellation in 1960. Stevens was married to a US Steel executive Charles Underhill, and while portraying Helen Trent during 1951–52, she made her television debut as the female lead of Lorelei Kilbourne on the Big Town television series.  

Stevens said she saw Helen as being similar to Edith Head. Stevens felt her character was boring and remembered the director allowed the actors to "fall around and scream with laughter during rehearsals. We had to keep our sanity. By air time we had gotten it all out of our systems and could be dead serious about the story."

During the 7,222 episodes (more than any other radio soap), Helen never married, and she always remained at the age of 35. However, she had a long-running beau, Gil Whitney.

An unusual incident occurred during a 1948 broadcast, as documented in Tune in Tomorrow (1968), the memoir by Mary Jane Higby, who portrayed Cynthia Carter on the program. As Gil attempted to convince Helen of his love for her, Helen again demurred and hesitated. Suddenly, a voice came over the airwaves, saying, "Ah, for chrissakes, lay the dame and get it over with!" As crew members tried to locate the voice inside the studio, the man proceeded to give sexually graphic examples of what Gil should do with Helen. In spite of the shock, there were few protests from listeners.

During one of the opening scenes of the 1956 film The  Catered Affair, which filmed in the fall of 1955, an episode of the show is playing on the radio as Tom Hurley arrives home from his night job as a taxi driver.

See also
List of radio soaps

Further reading
LaGuardia, Robert. Soap World. New York: Arbor House, 1983.
"The Romance of Helen Trent," a short story based on the radio program, begins on page 30 of the July 1940 issue of Radio and Television Mirror.

References

Listen to
American Studies at the University of Virginia: The Romance of Helen Trent
John R. Hickman Collection: The Romance of Helen Trent

External links

Short story based on The Romance of Helen Trent, Radio and Television Mirror, April 1940, page 12

American radio soap operas
1930s American radio programs
1940s American radio programs
1950s American radio programs
1960s American radio programs
CBS Radio programs
1933 radio programme debuts
1960 radio programme endings